The following is a list of software used in the Personal Jukebox. It includes computer-based software, as well as device software

Device software

Software development kit
The original developers at Compaq Research designed an SDK (Software Development Kit) for the unit and published it under the Open Source GPL license in 2000.

Drivers
The PJB does not integrate itself as a USB mass storage device into modern operating systems. Special drivers are required to make the operating system recognize an attached PJB. Drivers for Microsoft Windows and Mac OS were included, while drivers for Linux were developed by the open source community.

Official Software

Jukebox Manager
The included management tool for the PJB is the Jukebox Manager (the latest Windows version is v1.5.6). It is a pretty basic application which can create/delete/manage Sets, Discs and Tracks (when uploading, the user can choose which ID3-tag will represent which level). It can also encode CDs directly onto the PJB and query the CDDB for the proper disc/track information. Finally it can update the firmware. If manipulating some values in the Windows Registry, a hidden menu appears, which can be used to debug and in some cases repair a damaged TOC. The Jukebox Manager does not make use of some of the firmware's later features, such as downloading tracks back to the computer and does not provide advanced features such as mass-uploading, synchronizing or creating playlists from M3U-playlists.

Jukemon
A tool for Mac OS X that was developed to replace the Jukebox Manager, which would only run on the classic Mac OS. It also implements the PJB's USB drivers, so when using Jukemon, no additional drivers for the PJB are required.

Unofficial Software

pjbExploder
Development of the pjbExploder was started by Enea Mansutti in 2001 and later continued by Michael Hotchin. It is an open source project under the GPL, with its development page residing on SourceForge. The latest version currently available is v1.0.47 (November 9, 2006).

This software has the same uploading capabilities of Sets/Discs/Tracks as the Jukebox Manager, but also provides additional features, such as mass-uploading, synchronizing, a playlist manager, creation of CUE-sheets, advanced search and sorting options, uploading of non-MP3 data files as well as the ability to re-download tracks to the PC or the playback of tracks on the PJB via the computer's audio hardware in real-time.

MP3Loader (discontinued)
MP3Loader was a shareware project by Robert Valentino and was popular for its mass-uploading capabilities, either representing fixed directory structures as Set/Discs/Tracks, or using M3u-playlists to generate the structure on the PJB.

OpenPJB
The OpenPJB/pjbsdk Project on SourceForge tries to provide a base for all (open source) PJB applications, while also further developing the SDK. They also provide the PJB Tools, a collection of tools for the command line of various operating systems, published under the GPL (including documentations and a modified version of the SDK).

Linux projects
There are also various Linux projects operating on SourceForge (some under the banner of the OpenPJB project). These range from Jukebox-Manager-like applications with a GUI for various window managers to projects making the PJB's file system mountable as a drive in Linux. Some of the projects include:
 Jukebox Manager (KDE)
 GNOME/GTK+ GUI Personal Jukebox Manager (GNOME)
 Emacs PJB Manager
 PJB File System for Linux (Kernel 2.3/4, 2.6)
 PJB VFS module (for use with Nautilus)
 pjmirror (written in Perl to synchronize the PJB with data on the PC)

Personal jukebox
Jukebox-style media players